Thakur Bakhtawar Singh (also known as IG Bakhtawar Singhji) was the Inspector General of Police of Jodhpur (1946–48) while the transition of the Jodhpur State from monarchy to democracy and Merger in the Republic of India.
One of the most irrepressible officers of his time, he killed, suppressed or brought to book many dreaded dacoits during his service in the Police Department.

Background
His family belonged to village Kolu in Barmer District.

Career
He was trained initially at Phillaur Police Training School, Punjab and posted as an Inspector of Police in then Marwar in 1912.
He was a pioneer in organising the Railway Police Branch in Jodhpur as a train used to run from Jodhpur to Hyderabad in Sindh province.

Honours
He was awarded the King's Police Medal for Gallantry in 1929. In June 1946, the title of Rao Bahadur was conferred on him by Lord F.M.Wavell, Viceroy of India (1943–46).

References

 Memoirs of Marwar Police by Kishan Puri
 Marwar Ka Itihas by V.N. Reu, vol. II
 Marwar Ka Itihas by Jagdish Singh Gahlot

Year of birth missing
Year of death missing
Inspectors general
Indian police officers